Meir Abulafia is commonly known as "the Ramah" (Hebrew: רמ"ה). He should not be confused with Moses Isserles, known as "the Rema" or "the Rama" (Hebrew: רמ"א).

Meir ben Todros HaLevi Abulafia (c. 1170 – 1244), also known as the Ramah (an acronym of his Hebrew name), was a major Sephardic Talmudist and Halachic authority in medieval Spain.

Biography
He was the scion of a wealthy and scholarly family, the son of Todros ben Judah, to whom the physician Judah ben Isaac dedicated his poem, The Conflict of Wisdom and Wealth, published in 1214.

In his 30s, he was already one of the three appointed rabbis on the Toledo Beth Din (one of the other two was Joseph ibn Migash's son, Meir). As the Spanish kings gave the Jews more self-rule, Rabbi Abulafia played a substantial role in establishing ritual regulations for Spanish Jewry. He was also the head of an important yeshiva in Toledo. He was so highly esteemed in Toledo that on his father's death in 1225 the latter's honorary title of Nasi (prince) was applied to him.

He is well known for beginning the first Maimonidean Controversy over the Mishneh Torah while Maimonides was still alive. Outraged by Maimonides' apparent disbelief in physical resurrection of the dead, Abulafia wrote a series of letters to the French Jews in Lunel. To his shock and disappointment, they supported the Rambam. Thirty years later, when controversy erupted over the Rambam's Guide for the Perplexed and the first book of Mishneh Torah, Rabbi Abulafia refused to participate. Rabbi Abulafia was also opposed to the study of philosophy.

He died in Burgos, Spain at the age of 74 in the year 1244.

Works
Rabbi Abulafia was a prolific author. He wrote a huge book of novellae on the Talmud, entitled Peratei Peratin (Detail of Details). It followed the style of the Rif and was clearly influenced by Hai Gaon, Sherira Gaon, Joseph ibn Migash, Rashi, and Rambam. The only sections of this work that are extant are the parts on Tractates Bava Batra, Sanhedrin, Kiddushin, and the part on the fourth chapter of Tractate Gittin, each of which are known as Yad Ramah ("The Upraised Hand"—a play on the acronym Ramah).

Ramah discussed every minute detail of each topic, whether directly related or only peripheral, arising in the course of Talmudic discussion, generally including a summary of the main points at the end of the discussion. He wrote it in Talmudic Aramaic, sometimes making it difficult to understand. His work had a great influence on Asher ben Yechiel, who, in turn, influenced his son, Jacob ben Asher. Thus, Rabbi Abulafia's legal insights made their way into the Tur.

He also penned Halachic responsa in Aramaic, and wrote a commentary on Sefer Yetzirah, entitled Lifnei v'Lifnim. Rabbi Abulafia is credited with writing the authoritative Torah scroll for Spanish Jewry. Scholars came from Germany and North Africa to copy his master copy. He also wrote an authoritative book of regulations about Torah-writing, called Masoret Seyag La-Torah. R. Jedidiah Norzi, the author of Minḥat Shai, was so impressed by his work that he gave to him the honorific title of "expert" in what concerns the accurate text of the Torah. Ha-Meiri, however, in his Kiryat Sefer, was more critical of the masoretic work of Rabbi Abulafia, especially in his layout of the last two lines of the "Song of the Sea" (Shirat ha-Yam), which deviated from the arrangement found in the Aleppo Codex and in Maimonides' Torah scroll.  

His poem "A Letter from the Grave" is famous because it is a letter he wrote to his father in the name of his sister when she died. It was meant to inform him of her death and comfort him. She died on the Sabbath on the tenth of November 1212.

References

External links
 Masoret Seyag La-Torah, by R. Meir Abulafia b. Todros Halevi 

1170s births
1244 deaths
Year of birth uncertain
13th-century Castilian rabbis
Levites
Authors of books on Jewish law
People from Burgos
12th-century Castilian rabbis